La Teixonera is a neighborhood in the Horta-Guinardó district of Barcelona, Catalonia (Spain). The name honours Joaquim Taxonera, who urbanized the neighbourhood.

Teixonera, la
Teixonera, la